The 1856 United States presidential election in Indiana took place on November 4, 1856, as part of the 1856 United States presidential election. Voters chose 13 representatives, or electors to the Electoral College, who voted for president and vice president.

Indiana voted for the Democratic candidate, James Buchanan, over Republican candidate John C. Frémont and American Party candidate Millard Fillmore. Buchanan won Indiana by a margin of 10.32 percentage points.

A Democratic presidential nominee would not win Indiana again until Samuel J. Tilden narrowly won it in 1876.

Results

See also
 United States presidential elections in Indiana

References

Indiana
1856
1856 Indiana elections